Geissois  hirsuta is a tree species that is endemic to New Caledonia. It is known locally as geissois velu.

References

Flora of New Caledonia
hirsuta
Taxa named by Adolphe-Théodore Brongniart
Taxa named by Jean Antoine Arthur Gris